William H. Wells Community Academy High School (commonly known as Wells High School) is public 4-year high school located in the West Town neighborhood on the Near Northwest Side of Chicago, Illinois, United States. Wells is a part of the Chicago Public Schools system. Wells serves grades 9 through 12. Wells is named after former superintendent of Chicago Public Schools William H. Wells.

Currently, Wells serves a large section of the inner and central areas of Chicago, with its attendance boundaries reaching as far north as Webster Avenue, as far south as 16th Street, as far east as Lake Michigan, and as far west as Sacramento Boulevard. This area includes sections of West Town, Bucktown, the Chicago Loop, the Near North Side, and the Near West Side.

History
Wells was established in William Harvey Wells's honor approximately a year after his death in 1886. The current building opened in 1935 on the site of the original school with extra ground at the north. Originally, the city of Chicago planned for Wells to open as a junior high school in 1930; construction of the school was delayed.

Principal
In October 2013, Rituparna Raichoudhuri was named as principal of the school, succeeding Ernesto Matias. Raichoudhuri served as resident principal during the 2012–13 school year, and previously served in the office of performance management at Chicago Public Schools, and as a teacher in California.

Small schools
Wells includes 3 Smaller Learning Communities:
Law & Public Safety Academy (LPSA)
Fine Arts Academy
Gaming Academy

Athletics
Wells competes in the Chicago Public League (CPL) and is a member of the Illinois High School Association (IHSA). Wells sports teams are nicknamed raiders. The boys' basketball team won the public league championship in 1936–37. The boys' soccer team were regional champions in 2008–09, and the girls' team were regional champions in 2011–12.

Extra-curricular activities

Chess
GSA
Soccer
Cheerleading
Volleyball
Basketball
Baseball
Softball
Track & Field
National Honor's Society (NHS)
JROTC
ROTC

Feeder patterns
K-8 schools which feed into Wells include Andersen, Burr, Columbus, Chopin, Jenner, Lozano, Mitchell, Ogden K-8, Otis, Peabody, Pritzker, and Talcott.

Notable alumni
Curtis Mayfield – R&B/funk singer, songwriter 
Jerry Butler – singer, politician 
Michael Rooker – Actor 
Ramsey Lewis – Musician

References

External links
 

Public high schools in Chicago
West Side, Chicago
Educational institutions established in 1935
1935 establishments in Illinois